King Weeman (March 26, 1872 – December 23, 1955) was an American businessman and politician.

Born in the Town of Kossuth, Manitowoc County, Wisconsin, Weeman was a telegraph operator for the Lake Shore Western Railroad and Western Road. Later, Weeman was secretary and office manager of Raddant Brewery Company and helped start the Shawano Canning Company. He lived in Shawano, Wisconsin. From 1910 to 1918, Weeman served as Mayor of Shawano, Wisconsin. In 1919, Weeman served in the Wisconsin State Assembly and was a Republican. During World War I, Weeman served on the Shawano Defense Council. Weeman died in Shawano, Wisconsin.

Notes

1872 births
1955 deaths
People from Kossuth, Wisconsin
People from Shawano, Wisconsin
Businesspeople from Wisconsin
Mayors of places in Wisconsin
Republican Party members of the Wisconsin State Assembly